Shortness may refer to:

Short stature
Joselyn Palacios
Shortness of temper

See also
Short (disambiguation)